"What Keeps Mankind Alive?" is a song composed by Kurt Weill with lyrics by Bertolt Brecht for their music drama The Threepenny Opera which premiered in Berlin in 1928 at the Theater am Schiffbauerdamm. The title refers to the central line from the finale of act 2, . In the opera, the two stanzas of the strophic piece are sung by Macheath and Mrs Peachum and the final line is sung in fortissimo by the chorus.

It is an agitprop socialist anthem expressing that the comfortable lifestyle enjoyed by the rich is paid for by the suffering of the masses. The lyrics begin (in the John Willett / Ralph Manheim translation): "You gentlemen who think you have a mission / To purge us from the seven deadly sins / Should first sort out the basic food position / Then start your preaching, that's where it begins." The song ends with the conclusion, "For once you must not try to shirk the facts / Mankind is kept alive by bestial acts."

Translated into English by Marc Blitzstein, Willett / Manheim, and Michael Feingold, the song has been covered by Tom Waits (on the 1985 album Lost in the Stars: The Music of Kurt Weill, and again on the 2006 album Orphans: Brawlers, Bawlers & Bastards), the Pet Shop Boys (as a B-side on the single "Can You Forgive Her?" and on the 1995 compilation album Alternative), William S. Burroughs (in the 1994 documentary September Songs – The Music of Kurt Weill), and others. The opening chapter in The League of Extraordinary Gentlemen, Volume III: Century is named "What Keeps Mankind Alive?".

References

External links
, Lotte Lenya and others, Wilhelm Brückner-Rüggeberg conducting Sender Freies Berlin Orchestra (1958)
, performance, English and German text

1928 songs
Songs with music by Kurt Weill
Songs with lyrics by Bertolt Brecht
Opera excerpts
Political songs